Cambridge (Puslinch Lake) Water Aerodrome  is located  northeast of Cambridge, Ontario, Canada.

References

Seaplane bases in Ontario
Registered aerodromes in Ontario
Transport in Cambridge, Ontario